Arno van Wyk (born 19 May 1994) is a South African professional rugby union player, currently playing with French side  in the Top 14 competition. He usually plays as a hooker.

Rugby career

Blue Bulls

Van Wyk was born in Parow, but was never selected to represent  at school level. He moved to Pretoria after school to join the  academy prior to the 2013 season and made thirteen appearances for a  side that won the 2013 Under-19 Provincial Championship, scoring tries in matches against the Leopards and Border.

He made one more appearance as a replacement in the competition and was then called up to the South Africa Under-20 team. He was not initially named in the team, but replaced Malcolm Marx in the squad after he picked up an injury after their first match of the competition. Despite his call-up, Van Wyk failed to make an appearance in the competition. He returned to domestic action to make seven appearances for the s in the 2014 Under-21 Provincial Championship, including in the final which was won by the Blue Bulls after beating Western Province 20–10 in Cape Town.

Van Wyk made nine appearances for the Blue Bulls in the 2015 Vodacom Cup, starting eight of those. A further nine appearances followed in the Under-21 team's Provincial Championship campaign, where he scored one try in their match against the Leopards.

Montpellier

At the start of 2016, Van Wyk moved to France to join Top 14 side . He joined as a medical joker for the injured Charles Geli, also signing a youth contract with the team. He made his debut for the senior team in their Round 23 match against , replacing Mickaël Ivaldi for the second half of the match, and was named in the senior squad for the 2016–17 season.

References

South African rugby union players
Living people
1994 births
Rugby union players from Cape Town
Rugby union hookers
Blue Bulls players
Montpellier Hérault Rugby players
South Africa Under-20 international rugby union players